Curtitoma livida is a species of sea snail, a marine gastropod mollusk in the family Mangeliidae.

Description

Distribution
This marine species occurs off Greenland and in Russian waters.

References

 Moller, H.P.C (1842) Index Molluscorum Groenlandiae. Naturhistorisk Tidsskrift, (1) 4 (1) : 76–97
  Merkuljev A.V. (2017). Taxonomic puzzle of Propebela arctica (A. Adams, 1855) (Gastropoda, Mangeliidae) - six different species under single name. Ruthenica. 27(1): 15–30

External links
  Tucker, J.K. 2004 Catalog of recent and fossil turrids (Mollusca: Gastropoda). Zootaxa 682: 1–1295.

livida
Gastropods described in 1842